Jope is a given name, nickname and surname. It may refer to:

 Alan Jope, CEO-designate of Unilever
 Bernhard Jope (1914–1995), German World War II Luftwaffe bomber pilot
 Margaret Jope (1913–2004), Scottish biochemist, wife of Martyn Jope
 Martyn Jope (1915–1996), English archaeologist and chemist
 Jope Namawa (born 1974), Fijian footballer
 Jope Seniloli (1939–2015), Fijian chief and former Vice-President of Fiji
 Jorma Jope Ruonansuu (1964–2020), Finnish actor, impressionist, musician and stand-up comedian

See also
 Joop (disambiguation)